Quraquta (Aymara qura herb, quta lake, "herb lake", hispanicized spelling Coracota) is a lake in Peru located in the Puno Region, Chucuito Province, Kelluyo District. Quraquta lies southwest of the lake Parinaquta, near the Bolivian border.

References 

Lakes of Peru
Lakes of Puno Region